The 2006–07 Biathlon World Cup statistics gives a detailed tabular account of the accumulating Biathlon World Cup scores and related rankings of the top 30 biathletes in the Total (Overall) World Cup, and the top 15 in each of the Individual, Sprint, Pursuit, and Mass start Cups, as well as the top 10 nations in the Relay Cup and top 15 in the Nation Cup, for the duration of the 2006-07 World Cup season, including the 2007 Biathlon World Championships, which counted as usual in the World Cup scores.

For top 10 result listings and short summaries of all the season's World Cup races, please see the parent article.

Men's Overall Results

Total

24 of 27 races count towards the final standings. The top 30 are listed, along with those who finished top six in a single race.

Individual

3 of 4 races count towards the final standings. The top 15 are listed, along with those who placed top six in a single race.

Sprint

9 of 10 races count towards the final standings. The top 15 are listed, along with those who placed top six in a single races

Pursuit
7 of 8 races count towards the final standings. The top 15 are listed, along with those who finished top six in a single race.

Mass start

4 of 5 races count towards the final total. The top 15 are listed, along with those who finished top six in a single race.

Relay

Four of the five relays counted towards the aggregate total.

Nations

Only sprint, individual and relay events count towards the Nations Cup.

The top three of five relays and the top 12 of 14 individual or sprint races count towards the final standings.

Women's Overall Results

Total

24 of 27 races count in the overall standings. The top 30 are listed, along with those with a top-six placing in a single race.

Individual

Three of four races count towards the overall standings. The list includes the top 15 skiers and those with a top-six placing at an individual event.

Sprint

9 of 10 races count towards the overall standings. The top 15 are listed, along with those who placed top-six in a single race.

Pursuit

7 of 8 races count towards the individual standings. The top 15 skiers are listed, along with those who placed top six in a single race.

Mass start

4 of 5 races count towards the final total. The top 15 are listed, along with those who placed top six in a single race.

Relay

Four of five relays counted in the overall standings. The top ten teams are listed, as well as those who achieved a top-six placing this season.

Nations

Only sprint, individual and relay events count towards the Nations Cup. Thus the numbers along the top row in this table do not correspond to the numbers on the total standings.

The top three of five relays and the top 12 of 14 individual or sprint races count towards the final standings.

statistics